Rusty Nails is the second studio album released by Jackie Greene.

Track listing
"Pale Blue Monday" – 6:00
"Santa Fe Girl" – 5:19
"The Lord Mistreats Me" – 3:41
"Georgia" – 4:11
"Passin' on the Blues" – 4:32
"Blue Sky" – 4:32
"Gettin' By" – 5:31
"The Rusty Nail" – 3:47
"Waiting for the Whistle" – 5:08
"Falling Back" – 4:03
"Never Satisfied" – 3:39
"What I Know" – 3:27
"Freeport Boulevard" – 6:18

Jackie Greene albums
2003 albums